Hyderabad Aces is a city tennis team of Hyderabad representing in Champions Tennis League.

The players representing Hyderabad include Mark Philippoussis, Mikhail Youzhny, Martina Hingis and Jeevan Nedunchezhiyan.

References

Sports teams in Telangana
Sport in Telangana
Sport in Hyderabad, India
Tennis teams in India
2014 establishments in Telangana
Sports clubs established in 2014